Dildaar  is a 1977 Indian Hindi-language action film, produced by D. Rama Naidu under Suresh Productions and directed by K. Bapayya. It stars Jeetendra, Rekha, and Nazneen. Its music was composed by Laxmikant Pyarelal. The film is a remake of the Telugu film Soggadu (1975) starring Sobhan Babu, Jayachitra, and Jayasudha. Both the movies were made under the same banner and by the same director. The film was Above Average at the box office. Actress Nazneen received the film's only Filmfare nomination for Best Supporting Actress.

Plot
The film begins in a village where a farmer named Banke C. Lal (Jeetendra) lives along with his mother Lakshmi (Urmila Bhatt). He receives the 'Krishi Pandit award' for being an exceptional farmer helping create a green revolution. He falls in love with Parvati (Nazeen), the daughter of the sly village-head Charandas (Jeevan). A zamindar, Sangram Singh (Prem Chopra) is an associate of Charandas and together they are engaged in criminal activities. Latha (Rekha) is the original heir of the zamindari Sangram Singh claims as his own.  She is a timid person who has a phobia about owls. Sangram Singh exploits her phobia and tries to get her declared legally insane. Meanwhile, Banke asks Charandas for Parvati's hand in marriage. Charandas rejects him by calling him an illiterate person not fit for his daughter. Banke gets angry and vows that he will marry a girl who comes from a rich and educated background, who will be even better than Parvati. Latha tries to escape the clutches of Sangram Singh with the help of Prasad (Roopesh Kumar) but he tries to swindle her. She is rescued by Banke. Due to certain circumstances, they decide to quickly get married to each other. Sangram Singh tries to separate them. Meanwhile, Banke's mother does not approve of his marriage to Latha as Sangram Singh was responsible for the death of her husband Chotelal (Sujith Kumar). Despite these issues, Banke succeeds in establishing that Latha is not insane and is a normal person. Sangram Singh becomes desperate and tries to kill Latha, but Parvati comes between them and sacrifices her life to save Latha. Banke defeats Sangram Singh and the movie ends on a happy note for him and Latha.

Cast
 Jeetendra as Bankelal
 Rekha as Lata
 Nazneen as Parvati "Paro"
 Prem Chopra as Sangram Singh
 Jeevan as Sarpanch Charandas
 Shashikala as Sangram's Elder Sister
 Sujit Kumar as Chotelal
 Deven Verma as Salim
 Raza Murad as Psychiatrist
 Urmila Bhatt as Laxmi
 Jagdeep as Saudagarmal
 Roopesh Kumar as Prasad
 Birbal as Postman
 Keshto Mukherjee as Raju
 Meena T. as Phoolrani
 Sheetal as Savitri

Soundtrack

References

External links
 

1977 films
Hindi remakes of Telugu films
1970s Hindi-language films
Films directed by K. Bapayya
Films scored by Laxmikant–Pyarelal
Suresh Productions films